Jason Norrel Williams (born 28 September 1995) is an English footballer who plays for Tonbridge Angels.

Career
Williams began his career with Southend United and made his professional debut coming on for Michael Timlin on 15 February 2014 in a 3–2 defeat against Exeter City. In October 2014 Williams joined Chelmsford City initially on a one-month loan deal, which was later extended, where he was in impressive form, scoring five goals in seven league games. Williams returned on loan to Chelmsford City in January 2016 as one of interim manager Kevin Maher's first two signings, the other being fellow Southend United teammate Jack Bridge.

After being released by Southend, Williams joined Concord Rangers in June 2017 but left the Beachboys before the start of the season to sign for Bishop's Stortford, where he scored on his debut in a defeat at Tiverton Town. He moved to Kingstonian in February 2018, also scoring on his full debut against Folkestone Invicta.

Williams signed for Whitehawk in July 2018. He joined Hemel Hempstead Town in March 2019.

References

External links
 
 

1995 births
Living people
Footballers from Islington (district)
English footballers
Association football forwards
Southend United F.C. players
English Football League players
Chelmsford City F.C. players
Welling United F.C. players
Boreham Wood F.C. players
Bishop's Stortford F.C. players
Kingstonian F.C. players
Whitehawk F.C. players
Hemel Hempstead Town F.C. players
Black British sportsmen